Elena Leonidovna Nikolaeva (born 22 November 1969 in Dolgoprudny) is a Russian politician and businesswoman. She graduated from the Moscow Institute of Physics and Technology in 1993 and obtained the degree of Candidate of Sciences from the Lomonosov University in 2011. She has been a member of the State Duma of the Russian Federation since 2011.

References

External links 

  

1969 births
Living people
Sixth convocation members of the State Duma (Russian Federation)
Moscow Institute of Physics and Technology alumni
Deputies of Moscow City Duma